Nappanee station is a former railway station in Nappanee, Indiana.

History
The Baltimore and Ohio Railroad constructed the rail line through what would become Nappanee in 1874. The stop was originally a simple wood-framed structure, referred to as Locke-Eby after the nearby town of Locke. The current station building was constructed in 1910 in the Prairie School architecture style. Passenger trains ceased serving the town around 1969 with the discontinuance of the Washington–Chicago Express.

Nappanee became a stop on the Broadway Limited when Amtrak rerouted the train over the former Baltimore and Ohio Main Line in 1990. The town was selected as a stop due to the adjacent parking lot which was owned by the city. This route was discontinued in 1995. Nappanee again became an Amtrak stop when the Three Riverss western terminus was extended from Pittsburgh to Chicago on November 10, 1996. Service finally ended on March 7, 2005.

The depot underwent restoration in the early 2000s.

References

Transportation buildings and structures in Elkhart County, Indiana
Former Baltimore and Ohio Railroad stations
Former Amtrak stations in Indiana
Railway stations in the United States opened in 1874
Railway stations closed in 1969
Railway stations in the United States opened in 1990
Railway stations closed in 1995
Railway stations in the United States opened in 1996
Railway stations closed in 2005